Agonopterix laterella is a moth of the family Depressariidae. It is found in most of Europe.

The wingspan is 20–25 mm. Adults are on wing from July to March.

The larvae feed on Centaurea cyanus.

References

External links
lepiforum.de

Moths described in 1775
Agonopterix
Moths of Europe